Cornelius William Stynes (December 10, 1868 – March 26, 1944) was a Major League Baseball catcher. He played two games for the  Cleveland Infants of the short-lived Players' League. He had zero hits in eight at bats.

At 6 feet tall and 195 pounds - Neil was a right handed thrower and batter and made his 1890s Cleveland Infants debut at age 21.

References

Sources

1868 births
1944 deaths
Cleveland Infants players
Baseball players from Massachusetts
Major League Baseball catchers
19th-century baseball players